The term care drain coined in 2002 by the feminist sociologist Arlie Hochschild, is a feminist critique of brain drain's under theorization of the feminized migration in the global care chain and the impact it has on the families these women leave behind. Conversely care gain refers to the benefits for women migrant workers, their families and the sending nations. 

Care drain is notable in five migratory streams:   

 From Eastern Europe to Western Europe  
 From Mexico, Central/South America to the United States  
 From North Africa to Southern Europe  
 From South Asia to the Gulf states  
 From Philippines to all over the world, including Hong Kong, US, Europe and Israel.

References

Further reading 

 

 

 

 

Labor
Globalization
Caregiving
Human migration
Brain drain
Domestic workers
Sociological theories
Sociological terminology